Benny Cassette (born in Los Angeles) is an American record producer, rapper, singer, and songwriter. Signed to Kanye West's Very Good Beats as a producer since 2013, he worked on Kanye West's Yeezus and The Life of Pablo albums among other collaborative projects  with artists including SZA, Earthgang, Isaiah Rashad, Diana Gordon, Jacob Banks and Ciara among others.

In 2018 Cassette began to release work as a solo artist under the name Benn Good. His first body of work included features from Isaiah Rashad and BJ The Chicago Kid.

Early life 
Benny Cassette was born in Los Angeles, California. Neither of his parents were involved in the music industry; his father worked as an architect. Cassette was nonetheless exposed to the diverse local music. He has stated, "I came up in the LA hip hop scene listening to N.W.A and the Beastie Boys. On top of that, I grew up in a Latino neighborhood where I heard salsa, ranchero and oldies. At home, my dad listened to jazz, and at school kids either played rap at lunchtime, or rock after school." In high school he began rapping as part of a youth performance group, which inspired him to consider pursuing music as a career. He toured with the group during his summers, performing at diverse locations, including prisons. He stated, "I learned real quick how to cover stuff up because if you mess up there, on stage, you get booed."

Career

2013–2014: Early work and G.O.O.D. Music 
In 2013 Cassette signed with G.O.O.D. Music as a producer. His first project was Kanye West's Yeezus album. Cassette has since collaborated with artists and friends such as Miguel, John Legend, SZA, EarthGang, Eric Bellinger, the Band Perry, Burna Boy, and Bree Runway.

On April 1, 2014, Cassette released two official remixes of Sky Ferreira songs: "I Blame Myself" and "You're Not the One." Both songs were originally on Ferreira's 2013 debut Night Time, My Time, and the remixes were exclusively released through Spin Magazine. Spin said, "Cassette bolsters the tight snares of the singer's 'I Blame Myself' into a trap-addled bounce and softens the lovelorn 'You're Not the One' into a breezy, skip-along groove."

In 2014, Cassette co-wrote, co-produced, and co-executive produced the Mary Lambert album Heart on My Sleeve, which she recorded for Capitol Records. He co-wrote the album track "Secrets" with Lambert, Eric Rosse, and MoZella. The single was released in early August 2014, along with the track "When You Sleep."

In 2015, Cassette began working with SZA. on currently unreleased songs.

In 2019, Cassette worked as a producer on "Collide" and "My Money, My Baby" off Queen & Slim (soundtrack), which was released in November through Motown Records. The former went on to be nominated for Best R&B Song at the 63rd annual GRAMMY Awards.

2014–present: Artist projects 

In 2014 Cassette released the song "Raging Bull," which "features Benny Cassette's own vocals over his synthesized and drum-pounding production", and which was followed by a music video. About Cassette's production, AFRSH.com wrote that Cassette "has mastered a distinct hybrid of hip-hop, alternative and pop music (which is evident on ("Raging Bull") that proves utterly infectious."

Around 2014, Cassette announced several upcoming EPs. In September 2014, Cassette released his single "Virgo Season," which featured Isaiah Rashad. He premiered the music video for his "Sex and Faith" single in December. In May 2016, Benny released "Entertain Us", the first single off his upcoming album Broken Hearts and Dollar Signs. It reached No. 6 on the Billboard Viral Spotify 50 chart.

On May 27, 2021, Cassette released his EP 'Love God Get Money' under his artist name Benn Good on Capitol Records. The title track was the leading single off the 7-track EP and debuted with an official music video.

Personal life 
Cassette continues to live in his hometown of Los Angeles, and remains involved in the local music scene there. He is a follower of the Baháʼí Faith, with which community he remains involved. He frequently participates in Baháʼí activities and Baháʼí community life.

Discography

Singles (as Benn Good)

Albums (as Benn Good)

Remixes

Collaborations

Production credits

Albums

Songs

Further reading 
Articles

References

External links 
Official website
Benny Cassette on Facebook
Benny Cassette on Twitter
Benny Cassette on VEVO

Living people
People from Los Angeles
Year of birth missing (living people)